Hitoshi "Mel" Wakabayashi (born April 23, 1943, in Slocan City, British Columbia) is a former All-American ice hockey player, a right-handed center, who played for the 1964 NCAA champion Michigan Wolverines hockey team.  He was also named Player of the Year in the Western Collegiate Hockey Association in 1966.  He went on to play 11 season in the Japan Ice Hockey League and to coach the Japan men's national ice hockey team at international competitions, including the 1980 Winter Olympics. After his hockey career ended, Wakabayashi became the President of Seibu Canada.  In 2001, Wakabayashi was selected by the WCHA as one of the Top 50 Players in 50-year history of the conference.  He was also inducted into the University of Michigan Athletic Hall of Honor in 2006.

Youth in Canada
Wakabayashi was the son of Japanese-born parents who lived in Vancouver, British Columbia.  During World War II, his parents were placed in a Japanese-Canadian internment camp at Slocan City, British Columbia.  It was at the barren internment camp at Slocan City that Mel was born.  Along with thousands of other Japanese-Canadian families, the Wakabayashi family was moved to a second internment camp in Northern Ontario shortly after Mel was born.  When Mel's brother, Osamu "Herb" Wakabayashi, was born in December 1944, the family was living in the Neys, Ontario internment camp on the northern shore of Lake Superior.  In 1950, the family moved to Chatham, Ontario, where Mel grew up with his seven siblings.  He excelled in both hockey and baseball, playing junior hockey with the Chatham Maroons and baseball for the Ontario Baseball Association championship team.  As a youth, Wakabayashi was a baseball teammate of Chatham native and future Baseball Hall of Famer Ferguson Jenkins.

University of Michigan
University of Michigan hockey coach Al Renfrew visited Chatham to watch Wakabayashi play, and invited him to play hockey for the Wolverines.  In January 1963, Wakabayashi enrolled at Michigan, but due to the freshman eligibility rule, Wakabayashi had to wait until January 1964 to play for the hockey team.  Wakabayashi made an immediate impact, scoring 21 goals and 17 assists in 1964.  He helped the Wolverines win the 1964 NCAA championship and scored two goals in the championship game against the University of Denver.  As a junior in 1965, he was the  leading scorer for Michigan and in the WCHA.  He was awarded the Hall Downes Award as the team's Most Valuable Player and was named a first-team All-American.   As a senior in 1966, he was the leading scorer in the WCHA and was named the league's Player of the Year.

Wakabayashi was known for his ability to avoid penalties.  In three years of collegiate hockey, Wakabayashi received only one penalty, a tripping call in his sophomore season.  He later recalled, "Since I started playing hockey in pee wees, my coaches really banged it into my head that I was supposed to score the goals, not try to knock the big guys around and end up getting hurt or getting a penalty. I remember very clearly the feeling of sitting in that penalty box-and how much I realized I didn't like sitting in that box!"

In a 2002 profile, writer John U. Bacon wrote that Wakabayashi "is perhaps the most unlikely star in the long history of Michigan sports, and surely one of the most inspirational."  Former teammate Dean Lucier said, "The college game was made for him.  He's the best player I've ever stepped on the ice with, for or against, and that includes Tony Esposito and Keith Magnuson."

Wakabayashi also played baseball at the University of Michigan and was named to the All-Big Ten Conference team as a second baseman.

Japanese hockey
In January 1967, Wakabayashi signed with the Detroit Red Wings and was assigned to play with the Red Wings' farm club in Memphis, Tennessee.  He played in 1967 for the Memphis Red Wings and the Johnstown Jets.  However, as one columnist later observed, "5-6, 150 pound Japanese forwards were not in great demand in the National Hockey League."  In 1968, Wakabayashi moved to Japan, where he played 11 years in the Japan Ice Hockey League, mostly for the Kokudo Bunnies.  He was regularly among the league's leading scorers and played seven consecutive seasons without a penalty.  While still playing, Wakabayashi also became the team's head coach in 1978.  Wakabayashi also coached the Japan men's national ice hockey team at several international events, including the 1980 Winter Olympics. He continued to coach in the Japanese Hockey League until 1994.

Career with Seibu Canada
The owner of the Kokudo Bunnies, Yoshiaki Tsutsumi, owned the Seibu department store chain, the Seibu railroads and was Japan's largest landowner.  After Wakabayashi's hockey career ended, Tsutsumi hired him as President of Seibu Canada, owner of the Westin Prince Hotel in Toronto.  In a 2002 interview, Wakabayashi credited his Michigan experience as the key to his success: "If not for Al Renfrew and the Michigan hockey team, I would probably be working with my dad in the factory in Chatham. I don't even want to think about that one."

Honors
In 2001, Wakabayashi was one of three University of Michigan players (along with Red Berenson and John Matchefts) selected by the WCHA as one of the Top 50 Players in 50-year history of the conference.  He was inducted into the Chatham Sports Hall of Fame in 2004 and the University of Michigan Athletic Hall of Honor in 2006.

Wakabayashi's younger brother, Herb Wakabayashi, has also been inducted into the Chatham Sports Hall of Fame.

Awards and honors

See also
 University of Michigan Athletic Hall of Honor

References

External links

1943 births
Living people
Canadian ice hockey centres
Canadian ice hockey coaches
Ice hockey people from British Columbia
Ice hockey people from Ontario
Japanese-Canadian internees
Johnstown Jets players
Kokudo Keikaku players
Memphis Wings players
Michigan Wolverines baseball players
Michigan Wolverines men's ice hockey players
People from the Regional District of Central Kootenay
Canadian sportspeople of Japanese descent
Canadian expatriate ice hockey players in the United States
NCAA men's ice hockey national champions
AHCA Division I men's ice hockey All-Americans